16-Methylene-17α-hydroxyprogesterone acetate is a progestin of the 17α-hydroxyprogesterone group which was never marketed. Given orally, it shows about 2.5-fold the progestogenic activity of parenteral progesterone in animal bioassays. It is a parent compound of the following clinically used progestins:

 Chlormethenmadinone acetate (6-chloro-16-methylene-17α-hydroxy-Δ6-progesterone acetate)
 Melengestrol acetate (6-methyl-16-methylene-17α-hydroxy-Δ6-progesterone acetate)
 Methenmadinone acetate (16-methylene-17α-hydroxy-Δ6-progesterone acetate)
 Segesterone acetate (16-methylene-17α-hydroxy-19-norprogesterone acetate)

References

Abandoned drugs
Acetate esters
Diketones
Pregnanes
Progestogens
Vinylidene compounds